Beartrap Canyon Wilderness is a  wilderness area in the US state of Utah.  It was designated March 30, 2009, as part of the Omnibus Public Land Management Act of 2009.  Located adjacent to the Kolob Canyons region of Zion National Park, it encompasses and protects part of Beartrap Canyon Creek, a tributary of the Wild & Scenic Virgin River.  Beartrap Canyon Wilderness is bordered by the Zion Wilderness to the east.

Access to the canyon is from the LaVerkin Creek Trail in Zion National Park.

See also
List of U.S. Wilderness Areas
Wilderness Act

References

External links

Beartrap Canyon Wilderness - Wilderness.net
Map of wilderness areas in northeastern Washington County, Utah

Wilderness areas of Utah
Zion National Park
Protected areas of Washington County, Utah
Bureau of Land Management areas in Utah